Glen Orbik (1963 – May 11, 2015) was an American illustrator known for his fully painted paperback and comic covers, often executed in a noir style.

In the 1970s, Orbik and his mother moved to Douglas County, Nevada. He is a 1981 graduate of Douglas High School in Minden, Nevada. He studied art at the California Art Institute then located in Encino, later Calabasas, California, and now located in Westlake Village. He studied under the school's founder, retired movie and advertisement illustrator Fred Fixler.

Orbik eventually took over the classes when Fixler retired from teaching and taught figure drawing after returning from an extended hiatus. His work has been compared to Alex Ross and Robert McGinnis, and he was a popular teacher among fine art, comic, and video game artists. He most recently worked on a series of paperback covers for the Hard Case Crime series of novels.

Orbik resided in Van Nuys, California. He died on May 11, 2015, of cancer.

Works

Covers
The Swimmer DVD/Blu-ray (digital restoration) release
Stephen King novella Blockade Billy
Barbara Hambly novel Annie Steelyard and the Garden Of Emptiness: An Honorary Man
Cover to Stephen King novels, The Colorado Kid and Joyland
25th anniversary edition of Stephen King novel It
Joe R. Lansdale novella Hyenas: a Hap and Leonard Novella
Joe R. Lansdale novella Dead Aim
George Axelrod novel Blackmailer
Other
"The Inspirations of Oz Fine Art Collection" (participant)

References

External links

 The Artwork of Glen Orbik, official website bio, and gallery of Orbik and companion, Laurel Blechman's work
 Hard Case Crime series of reprinted and original pulp fiction novels, some illustrated by Orbik
 

1963 births
2015 deaths
American comics artists
American illustrators
American speculative fiction artists
People from Los Angeles
People from Minden, Nevada
Role-playing game artists